Mycena flavoalba, commonly known as the ivory bonnet, is a species of inedible mushroom in the family Mycenaceae. The cap color is ivory-white to yellowish white, sometimes more yellowish at the center. The mushroom is found in Europe, the Middle East, and North America, where it grows scattered or in dense groups under conifers and on humus in oak woods.

Taxonomy, classification, and naming
First described as Agaricus flavoalbus by Swedish mycologist Elias Magnus Fries in 1838, it was assigned its current name in 1872 by Lucien Quélet. American mycologist Rolf Singer transferred the species to the genera Hemimycena and Marasmiellus in 1938 and 1951, respectively.  Singer later changed his mind about these placements, and his 1986 Agaricales in Modern Taxonomy, he considered the species a Mycena. The binomials resulting from these transfers are considered synonyms; another synonym is Mycena luteoalba (Bolton) Gray.

The specific epithet flavoalba ("yellow-white") is a compound of the Latin adjectives flavus ("yellow) and alba ("white"). The mushroom's common name is the "ivory bonnet".

Description

It may develop a papilla (a nipple-like structure) in its center. The cap margin is initially pressed against the stem, but in maturity either flares out or curves inward slightly. The cap surface is smooth, moist, and partially translucent, so that the outline of the gills underneath the cap may be seen. The mushroom is hygrophanous (changing color as it loses or gains moisture), being cream-buff to yellowish initially, with a paler (almost white) margin, and fading to buff in the center and yellowish-white along the margin when dry. The flesh is yellowish to white, thick under the disc but otherwise thin, moderately fragile, and without any distinctive odor and taste.

The gills are ascending and somewhat hooked or toothed, narrow at first but becoming rather broad (2.5 mm and becoming 3–4 mm). They are nearly equal in width throughout or slightly ventricose in age, with a spacing that is close to subdistant. About 18–24 gills reach the stem, with two tiers of lamellulae (short gills that do not extend fully from the cap margin to the stem) that may develop veins running between them. The gills are white to creamy-white with edges that are even and whitish, and waxy in appearance and consistency. The base of the stem is either strigose (covered with sharp, straight, stiff white hairs) or surrounded with a matted white mycelium. Above the base, the stem is smooth, and pruinose toward the apex. When moist it is translucent with slight ripples running transversely, and white to pale yellow in color. Mycena flavoalba is considered inedible.

Microscopic characteristics
The spores are 7–9 by 3–4.5 μm, ellipsoid, and nonamyloid. The basidia (spore-bearing cells) are four-spored. The pleurocystidia and cheilocystidia (cystidia found on the face and edge of a gill, respectively) are similar in structure and abundant, ventricose with long, rather narrow necks, and measure 46–62 by 9–14 μm. The neck is often encrusted with a mucilaginous substance, but it is otherwise smooth and hyaline. The flesh of the gill is homogeneous, and stains pale yellow in iodine. The flesh of the cap has a thin, poorly differentiated pellicle (a thin membrane), a somewhat differentiated hypoderm (that is most pronounced in old caps) and the remainder is made up of somewhat enlarged cells that stain pale yellow in iodine.

Similar species
Mycena flavoalba bears resemblance to some members of the genus Hemimycena, such as H. lactea and H. delectabilis. It can be distinguished from these species by its white to yellowish cap, and differences in the shape of both its spores and caulocystidia (cystidia on the stem). H. conidiogena, a Spanish species newly described from in 2005, is also similar in appearance, but differs in the distribution of pigment in the cap, and the differential staining in response to the dye cresyl blue—M. flavoalba is positive, while H. conidiogena is negative.

Habitat and distribution
The fruit bodies of Mycena flavoalba grow scattered to densely gregarious on needle beds under conifers, and on humus in oak woods during the autumns months. Although generally rare, the species sometimes occurs in large quantities in certain localities. In the United States, it has been collected from Colorado, Idaho, Michigan, North Carolina, Oregon, Washington, Wyoming, Florida, and Kansas. It is also found in Europe, and Israel. The species is listed as "Least Concern" in the Danish Red Data Book.

References

Cited text

flavoalba
Fungi of Europe
Fungi of North America
Inedible fungi
Taxa named by Elias Magnus Fries
Fungi described in 1838